Keckiella is a genus of plants in the plantain family. It includes several species of plants known commonly as keckiellas. A few species may be called beardtongues or penstemons because all keckiellas once belonged to genus Penstemon as the section Hesperothamnus. Keckiellas are native to the American southwest, especially California. They bloom in attractive snapdragon-like flowers. Genus Keckiella was named after the American botanist David D. Keck.

Species:
Keckiella antirrhinoides - snapdragon penstemon, yellow bush snapdragon
Keckiella breviflora - bush beardtongue, gaping beardtongue
Keckiella cordifolia - heartleaf keckiella, climbing penstemon
Keckiella corymbosa - redwood keckiella
Keckiella lemmonii - Lemmon's keckiella
Keckiella rothrockii - Rothrock's keckiella, Rothrock's penstemon
Keckiella ternata - scarlet keckiella

External links

USDA Plants Profile

 
Plantaginaceae genera
Flora of the Southwestern United States
Flora of California